Enteric can refer to:
A general term describing something related to or associated with the intestines
Microorganisms that inhabit the intestines are commonly known as enteric bacteria
Enteric nervous system
Enteric coating that is often applied to pills and supplements
"Enteric fever" is a name for typhoid fever
Enteric duplication cysts
Enteral administration of food or drugs given orally or rectally
Methane emitted from livestock is known as Enteric fermentation